Tupilakosaurus is an extinct genus of dvinosaurian temnospondyl within the family Tupilakosauridae.

Two species are known:
Tupilakosaurus heilmani Nielsen, 1954 — Wordie Creek Formation, Greenland
Tupilakosaurus wetlugensis Shishkin, 1961 — Vokhma and Kopanskaya Formation, Nizhny Novgorod Oblast, Russia

See also 
 Prehistoric amphibian
 List of prehistoric amphibians

References 

Dvinosaurs
Induan genera
Triassic temnospondyls of Europe
Fossils of Greenland
Triassic Greenland
Fossil taxa described in 1954